The Detroit Diesel Series 60 is an inline-six 4 stroke diesel engine produced from 1987 to 2011. At that time, it differed from most on-highway engines by using an overhead camshaft and "drive by wire" electronic control. In 1993, it was popular on many USA buses in the  displacement.

History
When it was introduced in 1987, the Series 60 was the first heavy-duty diesel engine with fully integrated electronic controls.

12.7L
Both engine sizes were also used in truck and tractor-trailer applications. 

In 1998, the 11.1-liter Detroit Diesel Series 60 was discontinued. Once the 11.1-liter Series 60 was discontinued, the 12.7-liter Detroit Diesel Series 60 became the motorcoach application. Starting in the late 1990s, Neoplan made the Series 60 as an available engine for their high-floor and low-floor articulated buses - the AN460A and AN460LF. Detroit Diesel began making Series 60 marine engines in 1999, with wider availability starting in 2000.

14.0L

In 2004 the 14-Liter engine became the dominant platform in Freightliner over the road sleeper trucks and changed the ECM to a DDEC V. The 12.7L engine was favored in buses for its better fuel consumption.

In 2007 the 12.7-liter Detroit Diesel Series 60 was discontinued. Once the 12.7-liter Series 60 was discontinued, the 14-liter Series 60 replaced it. By 2008, Detroit Diesel had produced one million Series 60 engines.

In 2007 - 2010 (2008 -2011 trucks), the Detroit Diesel 14L engine was modified to meet new emissions standards and went to a dual ECM configuration (DDEC VI). This engine ran higher compression, higher injector pressure and a DPF exhaust filter. The block and crank remained the same as the older 2004-2006 engine models.

In 2011 the series 60 engine was discontinued and replaced by the DD15 engine.

Specifications

Electronic Control
The most popular on-highway Detroit Diesel engine was the 12.7-liter, and on-highway engines are electronically-controlled by the proprietary Detroit Diesel Electronic Control (DDEC) system. The DDEC system was the first commercial use of a fully electronic control on a highway engine, and multiple years would pass before other manufacturers followed. The functions available in the DDEC system include engine diagnostic functions, shutdown timers, progressive-shift functions, fault-history, speed limiting, automatic-stall preventing, and cruise control functions; the cruise control function is popular with fleet operators due to the fuel-saving nature of this function.  The DDEC system permitted the owner to download engine management reports, including a record of the use of the engine.  The system was able to provide records of truck overspeeding, excessive idle time, hard braking, and other parameters, thereby assisting owners in increasing productivity, reducing engine abuse, and decreasing fuel consumption. 

Larger fleets purchased their own copies of the software, while smaller owner operators were able to have their computer datasets downloaded by the dealer servicing their engine. The DDEC system allowed dealers and owners to troubleshoot problems with their engines, permitted changes to horsepower settings, and in some cases, alternative programs were able to be loaded into the computer.

The DDEC system is easy to operate, and diagnostic functions are displayed to the driver. Typically, there are two indicator lights, one in yellow and one in red. The red indicator represents a significant-engine fault, and in most cases, the engine shuts down to protect the engine from damage. The yellow light represents a minor fault, and is a cautionary function to alert the operator to a fault that might not be dangerous, or represent immediate damage to the engine. The operator is able to gain basic diagnostic functions via these two lights. Accompanying the two lights there generally is a switch; when pressed in specific circumstances, the red and yellow lights will flash in a specific order and the operator is able to calculate a fault code, and know the specific problem with the engine.

DDEC I 

Initially the engine was controlled by the DDEC I System, which was shortly after replaced by the DDEC II system which would last up to 1992.

The DDEC I system was a two-box system. It had an Electronic control module (ECM) in the cab, and an Electronic Driver Module (EDM) on the engine to operate the injectors.

DDEC II 
The DDEC II ECM was a single box mounted on the engine.

The engine proved extremely popular with fleet operators, and built a strong reputation for reliability and longevity. It was also available in a popular "cruise power" configuration, while encouraging the operator to engage the cruise control function.

DDEC III 

In 1992, the DDEC III system was introduced, and is available in horsepower ratings up to  due to revised camshaft timing and other improvements.

The DDEC III system also introduced dual-voltage (12V/24V) ECM units. Previous DDEC ECM units are 12-volt only. The dual-voltage ECMs ease installation into 24-volt marine, industrial, and non-USA trucks. The use of Battery Charge-Equalizers (Vanner) is not required because the ECM can connect directly to the 24-volt batteries.

The DDEC III ECM is thinner than the DDEC II ECM, with wiring connectors at both ends. The front-end has two five-pin connectors for the injectors, and a thirty-pin connector for the engine-sensors. The rear-end has a five-pin Power Connector, six-pin Communications Connector, and a thirty-pin Vehicle-Interface Harness-Connector.

DDEC IV 

Competing power plants
 Caterpillar C13
 Cummins ISX
 Cummins ISX12
 Cummins ISM
 Caterpillar3406
 CaterpillarC15
 Cummins Cummins N14
 Cummins Cummins M11
 Cummins L10

References

External links
 
 
 

1987 establishments in Michigan
60
Straight-six engines
Diesel engines by model